Camille-Léon-Louis Silvy (1834–1910) was a French photographer, primarily active in London.

He learned photography from his friend, Count Olympe Aguado, in 1857, and became a member of the Société française de photographie in 1858.  He then moved to London and opened a portrait studio at 38 Porchester Terrace, Bayswater, becoming a member of the Photographic Society in 1859. Sitters in Silvy's portraits include Princess Mary Adelaide of Cambridge, Queen Emma of Hawaii, Lady Amberley, Harriet Martineau, Adelina Patti, Sara Forbes Bonetta and Frederick Robson.  He also photographed many members of the British royal family. The National Portrait Gallery, London, holds his studio's daybooks, which include details of some 17,000 sittings, with about 12,000 of these showing an image from the sitting. 

He closed his studio and returned to France in 1868.  He himself believed that his nervous system had been damaged by exposure to potassium cyanide in the darkroom but it is more likely that he suffered from manic depression. The last thirty years of his life were spent in a succession of hospitals, sanatoria and convalescent homes.
An English Heritage blue plaque commemorating Silvy was unveiled at 38 Porchester Terrace, London, on 16 July 2019.

Gallery

References

External links

Silvy in the NPG archive.
Biography at Getty.edu.
review of National Portrait Gallery exhibition by Richard Dorment, "Camille Silvy: Photographer of Modern Life at the National Portrait Gallery", The Daily Telegraph, 19 July 2010. Retrieved 10 August 2010.

19th-century French photographers
1834 births
1910 deaths
Artists' Rifles soldiers